Tazeh Kand-e Jamalkhan (also Romanized as Tāzeh Kand-e Jamālkhān; also known as Tāzeh Kand) is a village in Baranduzchay-ye Jonubi Rural District, in the Central District of Urmia County, West Azerbaijan Province, Iran. At the 2006 census, its population was 37, in 10 families.

References 

Populated places in Urmia County